The 2020–21 Bristol Rovers F.C. season is the club's 138th season in their history and the fourth consecutive season in EFL League One, Along with League One, the club will also participate in the FA Cup, EFL Cup and EFL Trophy.

The season covers the period from 1 July 2020 to 30 June 2021.

Transfers

Transfers in

Loans in

Loans out

Transfers out

Pre-season
Rovers announced their first pre-season game on 7 August 2020 that would see the first-team play the following day in a behind closed doors friendly against Bristol Manor Farm. They later announced a second fixture against Exeter City.

Competitions

EFL League One

League table

Results summary

Results by matchday

Matches

The 2020–21 season fixtures were released on 21 August.

FA Cup

The draw for the first round was made on Monday 26, October. The second round draw was revealed on Monday, 9 November by Danny Cowley. The third round draw was made on 30th November, with Premier League and EFL Championship clubs all entering the competition.

EFL Cup
On 18 August 2020, the first round was drawn.

EFL Trophy

The regional group stage draw was confirmed on 18 August. The second round draw was made by Matt Murray on 20 November, at St Andrew’s. The third round was made on 10 December 2020 by Jon Parkin.

Statistics
Players with squad numbers struck through and marked  left the club during the playing season.
Players with names in italics and marked * were on loan from another club for the whole of their season with Bristol Rovers.

|-
!colspan=15|Players out on loan:

|}

Goals record

Disciplinary record

References

Bristol Rovers
Bristol Rovers F.C. seasons